Assyabaab Salim Group Surabaya or Assyabaab Surabaya or ASGS was an professional football club from Surabaya, Indonesia.

History 
The club founded in 1930 in Ampel, Surabaya as Al-Nasher and joined NIVB competition in 1932 and later changed their name to Al-Faouz during Japanese occupation. In 1948, the club changed their name to Assyabaab; it is a nickname for Arab descent at that place, since most of the founder is the Arab descent. Assyabaab was one of the best club in Indonesian football at 1960–1970 era. At that era, many of Indonesia national football team player come from this club. Some players also played in Hong Kong after they played for Assyabaab. Later the club performance decrease.

After two decade hiatus from top-tier Indonesian football, Assyabaab promoted to the top level at Galatama on 1991. Later the club bought by Salim Group, and was renamed Assyabaab Salim Grup Surabaya. Consequently, they have better facility, and their performance increase. They can hold in top-tier football league for several years. They advanced to the quarter final at the 1994–1995 Liga Indonesia Premier Division.

Name History
 An-Nasher (1930–43)
 Al-Faouz (1943–48)
 Assyabaab (1948–91)
 Assyabaab Salim Group (1991–97)

Performance 
 1990 : Champion at "Divisi satu" or second level in Galatama
 1991–1992 : 13th place at Galatama
 1992–1993 : unknown position at Galatama
 1993–1994 : 3rd place in East group at Galatama
 1994–1995 : Quarter final at Liga Indonesia Premier Division
 1995–1996 : 9th place in East group at Liga Indonesia Premier Division
 1996–1997 : 10th place in East group at Liga Indonesia Premier Division

References 

Football clubs in Indonesia
Association football clubs established in 1948
Association football clubs disestablished in 1997
1948 establishments in Indonesia
1997 disestablishments in Indonesia
Defunct football clubs in Indonesia
Sport in Surabaya